The International Carrom Federation (ICF) is the international governing body for the game of carrom.  Such an organisation was first proposed in the 1950s, but the ICF was not formed until October 1988, when delegates from India, Sri Lanka, the Maldives, Malaysia, Germany and Switzerland met in Madras, India, for the first World Carrom Congress, at which the ICF was formed and an international set of rules was adopted.

Management Board 
The International Carrom Federation (ICF) is an association governed by Swiss law founded in 1988 in Chennai, India.

Currently the head office is based in Zurich, Switzerland.

 President: Josef Meyer 
 Secretary General: V.D. Narayan 
 Vice Presidents: 
 Elisa Martinelli 
 Langley Mathiasz 
 Nazrul Islam 
 Murtaza Khan Zulfi 
 Mouraly Venou 
 Dohun Bae 
 Zunaid Ahmed Palak 
 Assistant Secretary: 
 Rohini Mathiasz 
 Atul Behave 
 Treasurer: Ashraf Ahmed 
 Chairman | Media Commission: Murtaza Khan Zulfi

Events
 World Carrom Championship
 Carrom World Cup
 ICF Cup

World Carrom Championship 
 1st World Carrom Championship 1991 - Official Results Here.
 2nd World Carrom Championship 1995 - Official Results Here.
 3rd World Carrom Championship 2000 - Official Results Here.
 4th World Carrom Championship 2004 - Official Results Here.
 5th World Carrom Championship 2008 - Official Results Here.
 6th World Carrom Championship 2012 - Official Results Here.
 7th World Carrom Championship 2016 - Official Results Here.
 8th World Carrom Championship 2022 - Official Results Here.

Carrom World Cup
 1st Carrom World Cup 2001 - Official results here.
 2nd Carrom World Cup 2006 - Official results here.
 3rd Carrom World Cup 2010 - Not held.
 4th Carrom World Cup 2014 - Official results here.
 5th Carrom World Cup 2018 - Official results here.

ICF Cup
 1st ICF Cup 1989 - Official results here.
 2nd ICF Cup 1993 - Official results here.
 3rd ICF Cup 1998 - Official results here. 
 4th ICF Cup 2003 - Official results here. 
 5th ICF Cup 2008 - Official results here.
 6th ICF Cup 2011 - Official results here.
 7th ICF Cup 2015 - Official results here.
 8th ICF Cup 2019 - Official results here.

Members of ICF

Regions
17 Members in May 2022:

Americas (2):

  	Carrom Canada 	CC 	http://www.carromcanada.com
  	US Carrom Association 	USCA 	http://www.uscarrom.org

Asia (8):

  	Bangladesh Carrom Federation 	BCF 	www.facebook.com/CarromFederation.bd
  	All India Carrom Federation 	AICF 	http://www.indiancarrom.co.in
  	Japan Carrom Federation 	JCF 	http://www.carromjapan.com
  	Korea Carrom Federation 	KCF 	http://carrom.co.kr
  	Malaysia 		
  	Carrom Association of Maldives 	CAM 	http://www.carrom.mv
  	Pakistan Carrom Federation 	PCF 	http://www.pakcarrom.org
  	Srilankan Carrom Federation 		http://www.carrom4u.com

Europe (7):

  	Czech Carrom Association 	CCA 	http://www.carrom.cz
  	Deutscher Carrom Verband 	DCV 	http://www.carrom.de
  	Carrom Federation Francais 	CFF 	http://www.carrom.net
 	Federatione Italiana Carrom 	FIC 	http://www.carromitaly.com
  	Polish Carrom Association 	PCA 	http://www.carrom.pl
 	Swiss Carrom Association 	SCA 	http://www.carrom.ch
  	United Kingdom Carrom Federation 	UKCF 	http://www.ukcarromfed.com

National Federations 
 All India Carrom Federation
 Carrom Association of Maldives
 Carrom Federation of Sri Lanka
 Pakistan Carrom Federation
 Japan Carrom Federation
 Korea Carrom Federation http://www.carrom.co.kr
 Bangladesh Carrom Federation
 Malaysian Carrom Association
 Swiss Carrom Association http://www.carrom.ch
 German Carrom Federation http://www.carrom.de
 Canadian Carrom Association
 United States Carrom Association
 United Kingdom Carrom Federation
 Federazione Italiana Carrom  http://www.carromitaly.com
 French Carrom Federation
 Belgian Carrom Federation
 Polish Carrom Association http://www.carrom.pl
 Czech Carrom Association  http://www.carrom.cz

Other associated organisations 
These organizations are not official affiliates of the ICF, but use ICF rules.
 Carrom Ass. of New Zealand
 Saudi Arabia Carrom Federation
 United Arab Emirates Carrom Association
 Bahrain Carrom Association
 Myanmar Carrom Representative
 Swedish Carrom Association
 UK Carrom Club
 Spanish Carrom Contact

References

Notes

External links 
 

Carrom organisations
International sports organizations